Long Yuqiu (15 January 1926 – 22 December 2022) was a Chinese engineer who was a professor at Tsinghua University, and an academician of the Chinese Academy of Engineering.

Biography
Long was born in Anhua County, Hunan, on 15 January 1926. In 1944, he was admitted to Tangshan Jiaotong University (now Southwest Jiaotong University), and transferred to National Southwestern Associated University a year later. In 1946, he entered Tsinghua University, where he majored in the Department of Civil Engineering.

After graduating in 1948, Long stayed at the university and worked successively as assistant research fellow, assistant (1949), instructor (1952), and professor (1978). During the Cultural Revolution, he was sent to the May Seventh Cadre Schools to do farm works in Liyuzhou Farm in the suburb of Nanchang, Jiangxi province.

On 22 December 2022, Long died in Beijing, at the age of 96.

Honours and awards
 1994 State Science and Technology Progress Award (Second Class)
 1995 Member of the Chinese Academy of Engineering (CAE)

References

1926 births
2022 deaths
People from Anhua County
Engineers from Hunan
Southwest Jiaotong University alumni
National Southwestern Associated University alumni
Tsinghua University alumni
Academic staff of Tsinghua University
Members of the Chinese Academy of Engineering